Arthur Tuttle may refer to:

 Arthur J. Tuttle (1868–1944), United States district judge
 Arthur L. Tuttle (1870–1957), American football player and coach, mining engineer and executive